Trachypepla nimbosa is a species of moth in the family Oecophoridae. It is endemic to New Zealand. This species has been collected in Auckland as well as one specimen in the West Coast. Adults are on the wing in January however the West Coast specimen was collected in November. This species is classified as "Data Deficient" by the Department of Conservation.

Taxonomy
This species was described by Alfred Philpott in 1930 using a male specimen collected by Charles E. Clarke at Kauri Gully, Birkenhead on 13 January 1919. George Hudson discussed and illustrated this species in his 1939 book A supplement to the butterflies and moths of New Zealand. The holotype specimen is held at the Auckland War Memorial Museum.

Description

Philpott described this species as follows:

Distribution

This species is endemic to New Zealand. This species has been collected at the type locality of Kauri Gully as well as at other locations in Auckland and once on the West Coast.

Biology and behaviour
The adults of this species are on the wing in November and January.

Conservation status
This species has been classified as having the "Data Deficient" conservation status under the New Zealand Threat Classification System.

References

Moths described in 1930
Moths of New Zealand
Endemic fauna of New Zealand
Oecophorinae
Endemic moths of New Zealand